This is a list of protected areas in Cape Verde:

Integral Nature Reserves
Santa Luzia and the islets of Ilhéu Raso and Ilhéu Branco
Ilhéu de Baluarte, Boa Vista
Ilhéu de Curral Velho, Boa Vista
Ilhéu dos Pássaros, Boa Vista
Ilhéus do Rombo, northeast of Brava

Nature Reserves
Cruzinha, Santo Antão
Monte do Alto das Cabaças, São Nicolau
Costa da Fragata, Sal
Ponta do Sinó, Sal
Rabo de Junco, Sal
Serra Negra, Sal
Baía da Murdeira, Sal
Boa Esperança, Boa Vista
Morro de Areia, Boa Vista
Ponta do Sol, Boa Vista
Tartaruga, Boa Vista
Casas Velhas, Maio
Lagoa Cimidor, Maio
Praia do Morro, Maio
Terras Salgadas, Maio

Natural Parks
Barreiro-Figueira, Maio
Cova-Paul-Ribeira da Torre, Santo Antão
Fogo Natural Park
Monte Gordo, São Nicolau
Monte Verde, São Vicente
Moroços, Santo Antão
Norte, Boa Vista
Serra do Pico de Antónia, Santiago
Serra Malagueta, Santiago
Tope de Coroa, Santo Antão

Natural Monuments
Morrinho de Açúcar, Sal
Morrinho do Filho, Sal
Monte Estância, Boa Vista
Monte Santo António, Boa Vista
Rocha Estância, Boa Vista
Ilhéu de Sal Rei, Boa Vista

Protected Landscapes
Pombas, Santo Antão
Monte Grande, Sal
Buracona-Ragona, Sal
Pedra de Lume salt ponds and Cagarral, Sal
Santa Maria salt ponds, Sal
Monte Caçador and Pico Forcado, Boa Vista
Curral Velho, Boa Vista
Monte Penoso and Monte Branco, Maio
Monte Santo António, Maio
Salinas of the English Port, Maio

Ramsar wetlands
Lagoa do Rabil, Boa Vista
Pedra Badejo lagoons, Santiago
Ilhéu de Curral Velho and adjacent coast, Boa Vista
Salinas of the English Port, Maio

Important Bird Area
Central mountain range of São Nicolau
Coastal cliffs between Porto Mosquito and Baia do Inferno, Santiago
Fogo Volcanic Important Bird Area
Ilhéu Branco, east of Santa Luzia
Ilhéu Raso, east of Santa Luzia
Ilhéu de Curral Velho and adjacent coast, Boa Vista
Kapok tree, Boa Entrada, Santiago
Mahoganies at Banana, Ribeira Montanha, Santiago
Pedra Badejo lagoons, Santiago
Ribeira do Rabil, Boa Vista
Serra do Pico da Antónia, Santiago

See also
Protected areas
Geography of Cape Verde
List of mountains in Cape Verde
Jardim Botânico Nacional Grandvaux Barbosa, founded in 1986

References

External links
Protected Areas of Cape Verde 

 
Geography of Cape Verde
Cape Verde
Protected areas